Cameron Williams (born 18 November 1991) is an Australian cricketer. He played in one first-class match for South Australia in 2012.

See also
 List of South Australian representative cricketers

References

External links
 

1991 births
Living people
Australian cricketers
South Australia cricketers
Cricketers from Adelaide